In 2009, an advertisement promoting the Discovery Channel program Enigmatic Malaysia featured Balinese Pendet dancers, incorrectly identifying Pendet as a Malaysian dance, leading to anger in Indonesia.

The advertisement was shown by a private company in Singapore for a Discovery Channel programme on Malaysia. This prompted protest in Indonesia. Demands were made from the local governments, cultural historians as well as the tourism ministry in Indonesia for Malaysia to clarify the situation. The Malaysian government offered their apologies for the mistake done by the company, which was rejected by the Indonesian tourism minister Jero Wacik since the apology was given informally by phone, he demanded a written apology to make it more accountable.

The Malaysian government says it was not responsible for the advertisement, and later said that Discovery Channel sent an apology letter to the two countries, which said that the network was responsible for the advertisement.

Many Indonesian editorials and news stories continue to report that the offending clip is a Malaysian government advertisement despite Discovery's Singapore official apology.

Indonesian ultra-nationalists held anti-Malaysia demonstrations. The group Gemars began a registration for war against Malaysia and has stockpiled food, medicine and weapons including katanas and shurikens. A group of armed men set up road-blocks to check for Malaysians on a Jakarta street before police contained their activity. The group later dispersed itself without finding any Malaysians. Malaysian students of Gadjah Mada University in Special Region of Yogyakarta had rotten chicken eggs thrown at them by local undergraduates.

The Ambassador of the Republic of Indonesia to Malaysia was contacted by Foreign Minister of Malaysia to express Malaysia's position on the issue that has resulted in the deterioration of the bilateral relations of both countries. The Ambassador of Indonesia has contacted the Minister of Foreign Affairs of Indonesia as well as the Chief of the Indonesian National Police, who have assured that necessary measures will be taken to ensure the security of Malaysian citizens in Indonesia.

National Security Council secretary, Datuk Mohamed Tajudeen Abdul Wahab have instructed all Malaysian borders, which were manned by the military, had been tightened and enforcement agencies have been told to gear up for any possibility of members of the group penetrating Malaysian shores. This is in response to Indonesia's Benteng Demokrasi Rakyat (Bendera) threat to wage war by sending 1,500 troops – armed with sharpened bamboo – to Malaysia by air, land and sea on 08/10/2009. The group is the same one which had set up roadblocks in Menteng, Central Jakarta last month, in search of Malaysians.

List of Indonesian universities where students conducted the burning of Malaysian flags 
 University of Palangka Raya
 Universitas Pakuan Bogor
 Universitas Sultan Agung Tritayasa
 Institut Agama Islam Negeri (IAIN)
 Sultan Maulana Hasanudin (SMH) Banten
 Universitas Tirtayasa (Untirta)
 Universitas Muhammadiyah Ponorogo
 Universitas Pakuan Bogor
 Universitas Indonesia
 Sekolah Tinggi Akuntansi Manajemen
  Untag Banyuwangi
 Universitas Islam Sunan Giri
 Institut Agama Islam Riyadatul Mujahidin Ponpes Walisongo
 Universitas Untag Samarinda

References

2009 in Indonesia
Indonesia–Malaysia relations